Herbert Flugelman  (28 January 1923 – 26 February 2013), usually known as Bert, was a prominent Australian visual artist, primarily a sculptor, who had many of his works publicly displayed. He is known for his stainless steel geometric public sculptures. Among his best-known works are the "Mall's Balls" in Adelaide, and "the Silver Shish Kebab" (Pyramid Tower) in Sydney.

Early life and education
Herbert Flugelman was born in Vienna, Austria, on 28 January 1923, the son of Leopold and Irma Flugelman. As the Nazis came to power in the 1930s, Leopold was the first to come to Australia, in his official capacity as an agent for the German fabric company he worked for. He then arranged visas for his second wife, Annie, and Herbert to come as well. After queuing for three days for a train leaving Vienna, Herbert was initially turned away for not having the right papers. His uncle intervened, telling the guards that they were supposed to be getting rid of Jews, and Herbert was allowed to board. He met Annie in Genoa, Italy, where in 1938 they boarded a boat to Fremantle, Western Australia, before travelling to Sydney. Leopold got a job as a hotel doorman, later becoming manager. Herbert's mother Irma also escaped Australia, initially to London and then moving to the United States after the war, where she remarried.

Flugelman first worked as a jackaroo. From 1943 to 1946 Flugelman served in the Australian Army (although, being a foreign national, he was not allowed to fight).

From 1948 to 1951, he studied at the National Art School (East Sydney Technical College) in Sydney, where he studied paining under Frank Hinder.

Career
From 1951 to 1955, he travelled to Europe, including a visit in 1954 to Spain with his artist friend John Copnall. In 1952, he contracted polio in Vienna, spending some time being treated in a London hospital. The disease left him with severe disabilities in one arm and one leg. However, this did not stop him holding several successful exhibitions at the Piccadilly Gallery in London, including his first solo exhibition. He then moved to New York City, where his work was exhibited in the Bourne Gallery. He returned to Australia in 1955.

After a fire destroyed much of his work in his studio, Flugelman reassessed his career, and started to concentrate on sculpture. His first commission was by an Australian oil company in 1962, and other commissions followed, notably a bronze sculpture for UNSW (1964) and a copper and ceramic fountain for ANU (1966). In 1967, he created a sculpture called Equestrian, and in 1969, Black Box. In 1972, he created a work of performance art, called Burning Euphonium, in which he doused flames on a sculpture.

However, a particular sculpture created in 1971, comprising six tetrahedrons, proved to be a turning point in his career. First shown at Hawthorn Art Gallery, they were subsequently exhibited at several locations in ensuing years. A 1972 exhibition at the  Gallery in Sydney was also significant.

In 1972, Flugelman moved to Adelaide. From 1972 to 1983, Flugelman was a lecturer at the South Australian School of Art, and subsequently became head of sculpture. During this period, he completed some of his most famous work, in particular Tetrahedra, also known as Festival Sculpture (1974/5), at the Adelaide Festival Centre; Spheres, popularly known as the Mall's Balls (1977), in Rundle Mall, Adelaide; and Cones (1982), at the National Gallery of Australia in Canberra. Tetrahedra consists of seven tetrahedra made of shiny polished stainless steel, and reflects the 1970s Australian modernist style of the Adelaide Festival Centre. During this period, he also lectured at the City Art Institute in Sydney (now UNSW Art & Design).

From 1984 to 1990, Flugelman was senior lecturer and fellow at the School of Creative Arts, University of Wollongong. In 1991, he was made professorial fellow at the university, and in 1995 received an honorary Doctorate of Creative Art (Honoris Causa). In 1997, he received the Australia Council, Visual Arts/Craft Fund, Emeritus Award.

In 2008, a hard-bound survey of his post-1968 sculptures, primarily his stainless-steel work, was published by The Watermark Press. It was written by Emeritus Professor Peter Pinson (whose Sydney art gallery represented Flugelman), with photography by David Perry. The book was designed by Harry Williamson.

Art practice
After starting his career with painting, Flugelman turned to sculpture in the late 1950s after fire destroyed his studio. He began creating semi-figurative expressionist sculptures, then from the late 1960s he helped to lead a new wave of practices, with range of forms that included object-based sculptures as well as installations along with works of conceptual and performance art.

He experimented with a variety of materials, including ceramics, fibreglass, and aluminium, but his preferred medium was stainless steel, which he felt linked to the environment because of its reflectiveness.

He had a strong commitment to experimental art, which, according to artist and critic Donald Brook, "prevented him from acquiring a signature 'style' of the sort that would have projected him into the art history books in the usual way".

Group activities
Flugelman helped to run Tin Sheds art collective at Sydney University from 1969 to 1972. He was also a founding member of Optronic Kinetics, a group who produced kinetic sculptures and other projects.

He was a founding member of the Experimental Art Foundation (EAF) in Adelaide in 1974.  Initiated by Donald Brook, he was joined by Flugelman (who had moved from Sydney at Brook's suggestion), Ian North, Clifford Frith, and Phil Noyce. According to Brook, the EAF was "an engine for shaping beliefs about the meaning of works of art and the point of making them".

Personal life
In 1948, he met Betty Green at a dance on the beach at Cronulla, and soon afterwards they married and travelled to Europe.

Flugelman later married to Rosemary (nee Pryor), with whom he had four children; he was also stepfather to three others.

He lived in the village of Jambaroo, near Wollongong, from 1983.

Recognition and criticism
1985: Subject of an Archibald Prize-winning portrait by his friend Guy Warren, Flugelman with Wingman
2006: Member of the Order of Australia

Flugelman's career was not without controversy, such as "The Silver Shish Kebab", aka Pyramid Tower, a  tower of stainless steel pyramids and tetrahedra, placed in Martin Place, Sydney. After being heavily criticised by Sydney Lord Mayor Frank Sartor, the sculpture was moved to the corner of Spring and Pitt Streets. Pyramid Tower was a commissioned work, created as a memorial to William Dobell.

Another work which attracted press coverage was his satirical sculptural portrait of British prime minister Margaret Thatcher, created accidentally when sawing wood with a chainsaw when he was living in a rainforest near Kiama, south of Sydney.

Max Cullen wrote in 2002:

Death and legacy
Flugelman died on 26 February 2013 at his home in Bowral, on the Southern Highlands of New South Wales. His memorial service was held at Eastern Suburbs Memorial Park in Sydney.

Flugelman's archive is held in the Art Gallery of NSW's National Art Archive.

According to artist and critic Donald Brook, Flugelman had a profound effect on the "conservative art world" Adelaide in the 1970s, and influenced many still practising artists "not only because of his exemplary teaching and captivating personality. It owed a good deal to his ability to conjure large and surprisingly popular works of public sculpture out of an intractable material".

Collections
Flugelman's work is held in collections around Australia, including:
 Art Gallery of South Australia
 Art Gallery of New South Wales
 National Portrait Gallery, Canberra

Selected works 
The following is a partial list of the Flugelman's completed works.

References

Further reading 

 

1923 births
2013 deaths
21st-century Australian sculptors
20th-century Australian sculptors
Austrian emigrants to Australia